WBXJ-CD is a low-power television station in Jacksonville, Florida, United States, broadcasting locally on channel 34 (virtual channel 43) as an affiliate of This TV. It is owned by L4 Media Group.

History 
The station signed on the air in 1984 as W10AX, an affiliate of The Box music video network until that network was acquired by Viacom in 2001. The station changed their callsign to WBXJ-CA in 1995. After Viacom acquired The Box in 2001, WBXJ became an over-the-air broadcaster of MTV2. It broadcast that network's programming until 2015, when it switched to Biz TV.  In September 2020, WBXJ-CD switched from Biz TV to This TV.

The station shut down its analog signal in 2015 as part of the Digital TV transition for low-power stations. Upon becoming digital-exclusive, the station's calls were changed to the current WBXJ-CD.

References

External links
 

BXJ-CD
Television channels and stations established in 1984
Low-power television stations in the United States